Fatema Tuz Zohra is a Bangladeshi Nazrul Geeti singer. She was awarded Ekushey Padak in 2006 by the Government of Bangladesh. He sings Nazrul songs and modern songs. She has acted in television dramas, performed and performed in various programs. She has also published a book of poems, a book of two rhymes, a novel, a collection of stories and columns and a music book with Nazrul's songs.

Early life and career
Zohra studied in Joypurhat Government Girls High School. She debuted her music career in 1963. She took lessons from Habibur Rahman Shathi and Mithun Dey.

Zohra is also an actress. As of 2014, she has performed in 11 drama plays.

Acting life
in 1974 johura He started acting in television dramas through the play Laguk Dola directed by B.M Harun. In this play, she played the role of a mute girl. Khaled Khan was opposite him. He later acted in the play Shiuli Mala based on the story written by Kazi Nazrul Islam and the play Last Night (2012) and Ghater Kotha (2016) based on the story written by Rabindranath Tagore.

Awards
 Ekushey Padak (2006)
 Nazrul Award (2017)
 Bangla Academy (2014)
 Theatre Honoring
 Press Club Award
 Sher-e-Bangla Memorial Medal
 Freedom Forum Honoring
 Pure Stage Award from London
 British Columbia Honoring Award
 Nazrul University Award
 Nazrul Institute Award (2016)

References

Further reading

Living people
21st-century Bangladeshi women singers
21st-century Bangladeshi singers
Recipients of the Ekushey Padak
Year of birth missing (living people)
Honorary Fellows of Bangla Academy
20th-century Bangladeshi women singers
20th-century Bangladeshi singers